Natalia Hawthorn (born 12 January 1995) is a Canadian long-distance runner. She competed in the women's 1500 metres event at the 2020 Summer Olympics held in Tokyo, Japan. In 2019, she competed in the senior women's race at the 2019 IAAF World Cross Country Championships. She finished in 86th place.

In 2013, she competed in the junior women's race at the 2013 IAAF World Cross Country Championships held in Bydgoszcz, Poland.

In 2019, she won the silver medal in the senior women's team event at the 2019 NACAC Cross Country Championships. In the senior women's individual event she finished in 16th place.

References

External links 
 

Living people
1995 births
Place of birth missing (living people)
Canadian female long-distance runners
Canadian female cross country runners
Athletes (track and field) at the 2020 Summer Olympics
Olympic track and field athletes of Canada
20th-century Canadian women
21st-century Canadian women